Berna was a Swiss company that manufactured buses and trucks.

Berna may also refer to:

Bern, Switzerland, in Italian, Portuguese, Romanian, Spanish, and other languages
Berna (Madrid Metro), a railway station in Madrid, Spain
A short form for:
Bernadetta (disambiguation)
Bernadette (disambiguation)

See also
Bern (disambiguation)
Bernie (disambiguation)